Camogli Molo Esterno Lighthouse is an active lighthouse located at the end of the external breakwater of the harbour of Camogli, Liguria on the Ligurian Sea.

Description
The lighthouse was damaged several times from the fury of the sea but was always rebuilt; in the night of December 16, 2011 a furious tempest took away the lantern that was lost. The lighthouse is powered by a solar unit, is completely automated and operated by the Marina Militare with the identification code number 1671 E.F.

See also
 List of lighthouses in Italy
 Camogli

References

External links

 Servizio Fari Marina Militare

Lighthouses in Italy